Charles W. Ray is a retired United States Coast Guard admiral who served as the vice commandant of the Coast Guard from May 24, 2018 to June 18, 2021. He previously served as the Coast Guard's deputy commandant for operations.

Early life and education
Ray is from Newport, Arkansas, and is a 1981 graduate of the United States Coast Guard Academy. After an assignment as a deck watch officer aboard USCGC Acushnet (WMEC-167), he was selected for Naval Flight Training and earned his wings in 1984.

Coast Guard career
Ray has served at six Coast Guard Air Stations from Alaska to the Caribbean. He was designated an Aeronautical Engineer in 1988 and has served as Engineering Officer at three stations and at the Aviation Logistics Center as the Program Manager for the development of the Coast Guard's Aviation Logistics Management System. He commanded Coast Guard Air Station Borinquen, Puerto Rico from 2002 through 2005. During the course of his career he accumulated over 5,000 hours of helicopter flight time.

Ray's staff assignments include a tour as Chief of the Office of Performance Management at Coast Guard Headquarters followed by a tour as the Chief of Staff of the Fourteenth Coast Guard District. Ray earned a Master of Science degree in Industrial Administration from Purdue University and a Master of Science degree in National Resource Strategy from the Industrial College of the Armed Forces in Washington, D.C.

On October 5, 2020, Ray tested positive for COVID-19. Other military leaders were quarantined as a result.

Ray held the title of Ancient Albatross from April 6, 2015 to April 22, 2021. This made him the longest serving Coast Guard Aviator and the 25th Coast Guard aviator to hold the title. He relinquished the title to Rear Admiral Melvin Bouboulis on April 22, 2021.

Flag assignments

On May 24, 2018, Ray assumed the duties of the vice commandant, the second-in-command of the United States Coast Guard.
Ray previously served the Coast Guard Deputy Commandant for Operations from August 2016 to May 2018. In this capacity, he was responsible for the development of operational strategy, policy, guidance, and resources that address national priorities. This oversight of Coast Guard missions, programs, and services includes: intelligence; international affairs; cyber; the maritime transportation system; commercial regulations and inspections; search and rescue; maritime security; law enforcement; defense operations; environmental response; contingency planning; and the operational capabilities of cutter, boat, aviation, shore, and deployable specialized forces.

Ray's previous Flag Assignment was as the Pacific Area Commander. Prior to that he held flag assignments as the Deputy Pacific Area Commander, the Fourteenth Coast Guard District Commander, service with U.S. Forces Iraq as Director of the Iraq Training and Advisory Mission for the Ministry of the Interior, and as the military advisor to the Secretary of the Department of Homeland Security.

Awards and decorations

References

Sources

External links

United States Coast Guard Academy alumni
Living people
Military personnel from Arkansas
People from Newport, Arkansas
Recipients of the Air Medal
Recipients of the Homeland Security Distinguished Service Medal
Recipients of the Coast Guard Distinguished Service Medal
Recipients of the Legion of Merit
Recipients of the Meritorious Service Medal (United States)
Year of birth missing (living people)
Vice Commandants of the United States Coast Guard